Felipe Alexandre Gonçalves de Sá (born 29 May 1995), commonly known as Felipe Sá, is a Brazilian professional footballer who currently plays as a forward for Hong Kong Premier League club Resources Capital.

Career statistics

Club

Notes

References

Living people
1995 births
Brazilian footballers
Brazilian expatriate footballers
Association football forwards
Hong Kong Premier League players
Segunda División B players
Tercera División players
Grêmio Osasco Audax Esporte Clube players
CF Gavà players
UE Sant Andreu footballers
AD Alcorcón footballers
AD Alcorcón B players
EC Granollers players
Resources Capital FC players
Brazilian expatriate sportspeople in Spain
Expatriate footballers in Spain
Brazilian expatriate sportspeople in Hong Kong
Expatriate footballers in Hong Kong
People from São José dos Campos
Footballers from São Paulo (state)